In 2016, there were 30 new This American Life episodes.

 air date: 2016-01-15

 air date: 2016-01-29

 air date: 2016-02-12

 air date: 2016-02-19

 air date: 2016-02-26

 air date: 2016-03-11

 air date: 2016-03-25

 air date: 2016-04-08

 air date: 2016-04-22

 air date: 2016-05-06

 air date: 2016-05-27

 air date: 2016-06-03

 air date: 2016-06-17

 air date: 2016-06-24

 air date: 2016-07-15

 air date: 2016-07-29

 air date: 2016-08-05

 air date: 2016-08-12

 air date: 2016-08-26

 air date: 2016-09-09

 air date: 2016-09-23

 air date: 2016-10-07

 air date: 2016-10-21

 air date: 2016-10-28

 air date: 2016-11-04

 air date: 2016-11-11

 air date: 2016-12-02

 air date: 2016-12-09

 air date: 2016-12-16

 air date: 2016-12-23

References

External links
This American Lifes radio archive for 2016

Lists of This American Life episodes
This American Life
This American Life